The Tunisian Women's Cup is a women's association football competition in Tunisia. pitting regional teams against each other. It was established in 2004. It is the women's equivalent of the Tunisian Cup for men. The winner of the 2019 edition is ASF Gafsa for the first time.

History
The first Tunisian women's Cup was contested in 2004-05 season.

Finals

Most successful clubs

See also 
 Tunisian Women's Championship
 Tunisian Women's Super Cup
 Tunisian Women's League Cup
 National Union of Tunisian Women Cup

External links 
 Tunisia (Women), List of Cup Winners - rsssf.com

 
Tun
Women's football competitions in Tunisia
Cup